Sufan may refer to:

China
Sufan movement (1955)

Iran
Sufan may also be rendered as Soofan, Sofan or Soffan.
 Sufan, alternate name of  Ghanem, Iran
Sufan-e Olya
 Sufan-e Sofla